Bhale Ramudu is a 1956 Indian Telugu-language drama film, produced by V. L. Narasu and directed by Vedantam Raghavayya. The film stars Akkineni Nageswara Rao and Savitri, with music composed by S. Rajeswara Rao. It is a remake of the Hindi film Kismet (1943). The film was simultaneously made as the Tamil movie Prema Pasam.

Plot
The film begins, Zamindar Narayana Rao (Jandhyala Gaurinatha Sastry) has two daughters Roopa & Tara and both learn dance since childhood. Especially Roopa is fascinated to it for which Narayana Rao constructs a theatre and affiliates dance teachers from all over the country. Nagabhushnam (C.S.R) is the manager of Narayana Rao who has two sons Rama Krishna & Gopal. Once Ramu throws Roopa from the staircase when she becomes a handicap. Knowing it, enraged Narayana Rao guns on Ramu and he falls into the river. Right now, Narayana Rao conceals himself, ahead, entrusting his property to Nagabhushnam. Exploiting the situation, Nagabhushnam grabs the authority leaving Roopa & Tara as orphans. Years roll by, Roopa (Savitri), by hard work studies and also takes care of Tara. Ramu (Akkineni Nageswara Rao) returns as a huge burglar by the name Krishna. At present, he recognizes everyone but hides his identity, acquainted with Roopa and their relationship turns into love. Thereafter, Krishna steals a necklace from Nagabhusham and presents it to Roopa but unfortunately, she was caught when Krishna affirms himself as a thief. At that moment, Roopa loathes him and charges to discard from her life. Meanwhile, Gopal & Tara fall for each other, being cognizant to it, Nagabhushanam warns Roopa and apart Gopal. By the time, Krishna releases rescue Tara from the suicide and assures to perform her marriage with Gopal. Parallelly, Krishna determines to relieve Roopa from her disability, so, he picks up the help of his friend Appanna (Relangi) and to raise the fund he again makes a robbery at Nagabhusham's house. At that point in time, Nagabhusham senses him as split-up son Ramu and gives a police complaint. Until, Roopa becomes normal and repents, learning regarding Krishna's daring act. On the other side, Krishna plans to couple up Gopal & Tara when to seize him Police organizes dance program of Roopa which she too agrees, on a condition that Nagabhuashanam should quit the case on Krishna. Here wanderer Narayana Rao also arrives to program and Krishna in disguise. After viewing it, Krishna leaps, successfully accomplishes the marriage of Gopal & Tara and surrenders himself. Just before, everyone lands at the venue when Krishna is recognized as Ramu by the tattoo on his arm. At last, Nagabhuashanam pleads pardon from Narayana Rao and pays back his property which he delegates to Ramu. Finally, the movie ends on a happy note with the marriage of Rama Krishna & Roopa.

Cast
Akkineni Nageswara Rao as Rama Krishna
Savitri as Roopa
Relangi as Appanna
C.S.R as Nagabhushanam
Gummadi as Inspector
Chalam as Gopal
Peketi Sivaram as Manager 
Dr. Sivaramakrishnaiah as Doctor
Jandhyala Gaurinatha Sastry as Zamindar Narayana Babu
M.S.Raghavan as Ramadasu
Gadiraju Keshava Rao as Bansilal Seth
Girija as Taara
E. V. Saroja as dancer in the song "Nanyamaina"
Hemalatha as Parvathi
Seeta as Bangari

Soundtrack

Music composed by S. Rajeswara Rao. Lyrics were written by Vempati Sadasivabrahmam. Music released on HMV Audio Company.

Box office
The film released for a second time on 12 December 1956. This time film ran for more than 100 days in 16 centers in Andhra Pradesh, and celebrated 100 days function in Vijayawada on 14 March 1957.

References

External links
 

1956 films
1950s Telugu-language films
Indian drama films
Films scored by S. Rajeswara Rao
Films directed by Vedantam Raghavayya
Telugu remakes of Hindi films
1956 drama films
Indian black-and-white films